Subterinebrica impolluta is a species of moth of the family Tortricidae. It is found in Carchi Province, Ecuador.

The ground colour of the forewings is white with an indistinct glossy greenish hue. The hindwings are creamy white, but creamy in the apex area.

References

Moths described in 2002
Euliini
Moths of South America
Taxa named by Józef Razowski